Suguri Hashitani (born 15 November 1997) is a Japanese professional footballer who plays as a defender for WE League club AC Nagano Parceiro Ladies.

Club career 
Hashitani made her WE League debut on 18 September 2021.

References 

Living people
1997 births
Women's association football defenders
WE League players
Japanese women's footballers
Association football people from Miyazaki Prefecture
AC Nagano Parceiro Ladies players